Magda Košútová (born 6 August 1955) is a former Slovak politician, who served as a Member of the National Council in the caucus of Direction – Slovak Social Democracy from 2006 to 2016.

In 2010 she announced her bid to run for the Governor of the Trenčín Region, but eventually supported Pavol Sedláček.

She graduated from the Slovak University of Agriculture.

External links 
Profile at the National Council website: Magda Košútová

References 

1955 births
Living people
Slovak politicians
Direction – Social Democracy politicians
Female members of the National Council (Slovakia)